Radzikowski (feminine Radzikowska) is a Polish surname. Notable people with the surname include:

 Heinz Radzikowski, German field hockey player
 Krystyna Hołuj-Radzikowska, Polish chess player
 Krzysztof Radzikowski, Polish strongman
 Walery Eljasz-Radzikowski, Polish painter